Peter DePew House is a historic home in New City in Rockland County, New York. It is a -story dwelling built of locally quarried sandstone. The oldest section dates to about 1750. The property also has a large timber-framed barn.

It was listed on the National Register of Historic Places in 2008.

References

External links
 Orangetown Historical Museum & Archives

Houses on the National Register of Historic Places in New York (state)
Houses completed in 1750
Houses in Rockland County, New York
Museums in Rockland County, New York
History museums in New York (state)
National Register of Historic Places in Rockland County, New York